Nikolay Mikhaylovich Nikolsky (1877–1959) was a Russian and Soviet religious historian, orientalist and biblical scholar. He became a corresponding member of USSR Academy of Science in 1946.

Sources

1877 births
1959 deaths
Writers from Moscow
People from Moskovsky Uyezd
Members of the Supreme Soviet of the Byelorussian SSR (1947–1950)
Russian ethnographers
20th-century Russian historians
Researchers of Slavic religion
Imperial Moscow University alumni
Academic staff of Belarusian State University
Academicians of the Byelorussian SSR Academy of Sciences
Soviet partisans
Recipients of the Order of Lenin